George Sinclair (Sinclar) (ca.1630–1696) was a Scottish mathematician, engineer and demonologist. The first Professor of Mathematics at the University of Glasgow, he is known for Satan's Invisible World Discovered, (c. 1685), a work on witchcraft.

Life
He was probably from the East Lothian area. He became a professor of the University of Glasgow, 18 April 1654, initially in a philosophy chair, then in a chair founded for mathematics. In 1655 he made descents in a diving bell off the Isle of Mull, to look at the wreck of a ship from the Spanish Armada there.

He was deprived of his university post in 1666, as a Presbyterian. He then worked as a mineral surveyor and engineer, and was employed in particular by Sir James Hope. He was brought in by the magistrates of Edinburgh, about 1670, to oversee piping of water from Comiston into the city.

On 3 March 1691, University of Edinburgh appointed him again to the professorship of mathematics, which had been vacant.

Sinclair invented an early example of a perpetual motion machine based on the principle of the siphon. He first proposed this in a Latin work on pneumatics in 1669.

Glenluce Devil
In his book Satan's Invisible World Discovered (1685), Sinclair described an alleged poltergeist incident known as the Devil of Glenluce. Sinclair described the incident as having a "usefulness for refuting atheism."

The incident is described as having taken place at the house of weaver Gilbert Campbell in Glenluce during October, 1654. A beggar named Alexander Agnew was refused a handout by Campbell. Agnew had promised to cause the family harm and over the next two years strange phenomena were alleged to have occurred at the house. This included the mysterious cutting of warp thread, demonic voices, strange whistling noises and stones being thrown. The poltergeist claims have been dismissed by researchers as a hoax. Magic historian Thomas Frost suggested that the phenomena was the result of conjuring trickery. The story was given to Sinclair by Campbell's son Thomas, a philosophy student from a college in Glasgow who was living at the household. Folklorist Andrew Lang suggested that Thomas had produced the phenomena fraudulently.

Historian David Damrosch has noted that Alexander Agnew commonly called the "Jock of Broad Scotland" was the first person in Scottish history to publicly deny the existence of God. He was hanged at Dumfries for blasphemy on 21 May 1656.

Geological pioneer
A long-neglected aspect deriving from Sinclair's work as a mineral surveyor is that the last part of Hydrostaticks - a short History of Coal - includes the first published  geological cross section in which he treats the strata in purely geometric terms.

Controversy
James Gregory, then a professor at the University of St Andrews, attacked Sinclair in a 1672 pamphlet The New and Great Art of Weighing Vanity, under the name of Patrick Mather or Mathers, archbeadle of the University of St Andrews. Gregory was both a Cartesian and an Episcopalian, and self-consciously invoked the Hobbes-Wallis controversy in aiming at the non-conformist Sinclair. The title of Gregory's pamphlet ridiculed Sinclair's 1669 book Ars Nova et Magna Gravitatis et Levitatis (The New and Great Art of Heaviness and Lightness). An appendix to the work, Tentamina de motu penduli et projectorum, was a more important essay on dynamics, regarded by D. T. Whiteside as a probable source of Isaac Newton’s theory of resisted motion.  Sinclair wrote an answer to Gregory, but it remained unpublished.

In 1684 he published as his own a work Truth's Victory over Error. It was in fact an English translation by Sinclair of the Latin inaugural dissertation given by David Dickson, who became Professor of Divinity, Glasgow in 1640, on the occasion in 1650 when he moved to Edinburgh. This was pointed out in short order.

Publications

Tyrocinia Mathematica (1661)
Ars Nova et Magna Gravitatis et Levitatis (1669)
The Hydrostaticks; or, the weight, force, and pressure of fluid bodies: made evident by physical and sensible experiments. Together with some miscellany observations, the last whereof is a short history of coal, and of all the common, and proper, accidents thereof; a subject never treated of before (1672)
Hydrostatical Experiments (1680)
Satan's Invisible World Discovered (1685, republished 1814)
Principles of Astronomy and Navigation (1688)

References

1696 deaths
Demonologists
Scottish occult writers
Scottish mathematicians
Scottish engineers
Year of birth unknown
Witchcraft in Scotland
Academics of the University of Glasgow
Paranormal hoaxes
People from East Lothian
17th-century Scottish writers
17th-century Scottish mathematicians